Kwahu West Municipal District is one of the thirty-three districts in Eastern Region, Ghana. Originally it was formerly part of the then-larger Kwahu South District in 1988, which was created from the former Kwahu District Council, until the southwest part of the district was split off to create Kwahu West District in August 2004; which it later was elevated to municipal district assembly status on 1 July 2007 (effectively 29 February 2008) to become Kwahu West Municipal District. The municipality is located in the western part of Eastern Region and has Nkawkaw as its capital town.

List of settlements

Sources
 
 Districts: Kwahu West Municipal District

External links 
 Kwahu West Municipal District
 Kwahu West Municipal District - Ghana Statistical Service

References

States and territories established in 2004
Districts of the Eastern Region (Ghana)